Kenneth Michael Leiter (born April 19, 1961 in Detroit, Michigan) is an American former professional ice hockey defenseman who played 143 games in the National Hockey League for the New York Islanders and Minnesota North Stars.

Career statistics

Awards and honors

References

External links
 

1961 births
American men's ice hockey defensemen
Ice hockey people from Detroit
Indianapolis Checkers (CHL) players
Kalamazoo Wings (1974–2000) players
Living people
Michigan State Spartans men's ice hockey players
Minnesota North Stars players
New York Islanders draft picks
New York Islanders players
Springfield Indians players